Cheshmeh-ye Papi (also Romanized as Cheshmeh-ye Pāpī; also known as Cheshmeh-ye Pā’ī) is a village in Dehpir-e Shomali Rural District, in the Central District of Khorramabad County, Lorestan Province, Iran. At the 2006 census, its population was 263, in 49 families.

Notes 

Towns and villages in Khorramabad County